"Because I Love You (The Postman Song)" (or simply titled "Because I Love You") is a song written by Warren Allen Brooks and performed by Stevie B. It peaked at number one on the US Billboard Hot 100 chart in December 1990 and remained there for four consecutive weeks. It also spent two weeks at number one on the Billboard Adult Contemporary chart. The song reached the top 10 in several countries worldwide, including Belgium and the Netherlands, where it peaked at number two. It received a gold certification in Australia and the United States. In August 2018, Billboard ranked the song the 71st-biggest hit in the history of the Hot 100.

Track listings
CD single
 "Because I Love You (The Postman Song)" (radio edit) – 3:46
 "Love Me for Life" (radio edit) – 3:06

CD maxi
 "Because I Love You (The Postman Song)" (radio edit) – 3:46
 "Love Me for Life" (radio edit) – 3:06
 "Because I Love You (The Postman Song)" – 5:00
 "Love Me for Life" – 5:16

7-inch single
 "Because I Love You (The Postman Song)" (radio edit) – 3:46
 "Love Me for Life" (radio edit) – 3:06

12-inch maxi
 "Because I Love You (The Postman Song)" – 5:00
 "Love Me for Life" – 5:16

Charts

Weekly charts

Year-end charts

Decade-end charts

All-time charts

Certifications

Groove Coverage version

"Because I Love You" is the first single from German trance group Groove Coverage's Greatest Hits album. Like most of Groove Coverage's songs it is sung by Mell, with Verena providing vocals during the song's bridge.

Charts

Other versions
In 1991, Hong Kong singer Alex To and Hacken Lee covered this song in Cantonese.
In 1992, saxophonist Richard Elliot covered the song from his album Soul Embrace.

In 1999, American-German singer Ray Horton covered the song on his album "First Time" and released the song as a single. The song was re-released in 2012 as digital download by Booya Records.

In 2002, German disc jockey and electronic music producer Marko Albrecht (mostly known as Mark 'Oh) covered this song on his single album Because I Love You: Mark'Oh meets Digital Rockers.

See also
 List of Hot Adult Contemporary number ones of 1991

References

Stevie B songs
1990 singles
1990 songs
2007 singles
Billboard Hot 100 number-one singles
Cashbox number-one singles
Groove Coverage songs